Bipen Behari Lal (30 January 1917 – 5 January 2008) was an Indian civil servant who served as the first governor of the state of Sikkim.

Career
Lal joined the Indian Civil Service in 1941 and was given various responsibilities in the Government of Uttar Pradesh until 1965. In 1966, he was moved to the Central Government where he served in various capacities.

In 1974, Lal was the Government of India-appointed Chief Executive in the Kingdom of Sikkim. Soon after the Annexation of Sikkim by India in May 1975, he was made the first governor of the new state of Sikkim. He served in this capacity till early 1981.

Death
He died in New Delhi, on the 5th of January 2008.

See also
 Palden Thondup Namgyal

References

|-

|-

|-

1917 deaths
2008 deaths
Governors of Sikkim